DOV or Dov could refer to:

דב or דוב, a Hebrew male given name meaning "bear", from which the Yiddish name "Ber" (בער) was derived (cognate with "bear") which was common among East European Jews.

People
 Dov Ber of Mezeritch (1700/1704/1710?–1772 OS), second leader and main architect of Hasidic Judaism
 Dov Ber Abramowitz (1860–1926), American Orthodox rabbi and author
 Dov Charney (born 1969), president and chief executive officer of clothing manufacturer American Apparel
 Dov Feigin (1907–2000), Israeli sculptor
 Dov Forman (born 2003), English born Author and social media star
 Dov Frohman (born 1939), Israeli electrical engineer and business executive
 Dov Gabbay (born 1945), logician and professor of logic and computer science
 Dov Groverman (born 1965), Israeli Olympic wrestler
 Dov Grumet-Morris (born 1982), American ice hockey player
 Dov Gruner (1912–1947), Jewish Zionist leader hanged by the British Mandatory authorities
 Dov Hikind (born 1950), American politician
 Dov Hoz (1894–1940), a leader of the Labor Zionism movement, one of the founders of the Haganah organization, and a pioneer of Israeli aviation
 Dov Jaron, American engineer
 Dow Baer (Berek) Joselewicz (1764–1809), Polish military commander
 Dov Karmi (1905–1962), Israeli architect
 Dov Khenin (born 1958), Israeli political scientist, politician and lawyer
 Dov Lior (born 1933), controversial Israeli rabbi
 Dov Lopatyn (died 1944), head of the Judenrat in Łachwa, Poland, and leader of a ghetto uprising
 Dov Lupi (born 1948), Israeli-American gymnast
 Dov Markus (born 1946), Israeli-American soccer player
 Dov-Ber Rasofsky (Barney Ross), American world champion Hall of Fame lightweight and junior welterweight boxer
 Dov Sadan (1902–1989), Israeli academic and politician
 Dov Schwartzman (1921–2011), Haredi Jewish rabbi and rosh yeshiva
 Dov Seltzer (born 1932), Israeli composer and conductor
 Dov Shilansky (1924–2010), Israeli politician and Speaker of the Knesset
 Dov Sternberg, American karateka
 Dov Tamari (1911–2006), French mathematician
 Dov Yosef (1899–1980), Israeli politician and government minister
 Dov S. Zakheim (born 1948), American former government official, economist and businessman

Fictional characters
 Dov, a character in Michael Tippett's 1970 opera The Knot Garden
 Dov Epstein, one of the series protagonists of Canadian TV show Rookie Blue

Other uses
 DOV Pharmaceutical
 Dover Corporation, stock exchange symbol DOV
 Dover (Amtrak station), New Hampshire, United States; Amtrak station code DOV
 German Eastern Marches Society; 
 A type of pulsating white dwarf
 Dulwich OnView, a community-based online blog/magazine in Dulwich, London, UK
 Dover Air Force Base